The Colbinabbin railway line (also known as Rushworth railway line) is a closed  branch railway line situated in both the Hume and Loddon Mallee regions of Victoria, Australia. The line was primarily built to serve the grain industries as well as providing a general goods and passenger service to townships in the area.

History
The line was opened in 2 stages from September 1890 to August 1914, and closed in October 1987.

The line was eventually extended to Colbinabbin, opening in August 1914, and a branch from Rushworth to Girgarre opened in May 1917. The line to Girgarre was closed back to Stanhope in 1975, and the remaining sections were closed in October 1987.

Stations

References

Closed regional railway lines in Victoria (Australia)
5 ft 3 in gauge railways in Australia
Railway lines opened in 1890
Railway lines closed in 1987
1890 establishments in Australia
1987 disestablishments in Australia
Transport in Hume (region)
Transport in Loddon Mallee (region)